David Dickinson  (born David Gulesserian; 16 August 1941) is an English antiques dealer and television presenter. Between 2000 and 2004, Dickinson hosted the BBC One antiques show Bargain Hunt, where he was succeeded by Tim Wonnacott. Dickinson left the BBC in 2005, and since 2006 he has been hosting the ITV daytime show Dickinson's Real Deal. The show sees members of the public bringing antiques and collectables to sell to a dealer or take to the auction.

In April 2003, he hosted his own daytime chat show series The David Dickinson Show and in 2017, he presented David Dickinson's Name Your Price for ITV.

Origins
David Dickinson was born in Cheadle Heath, Stockport, Cheshire, the son of Eugenie Gulesserian (born 1919 in Chorlton-cum-Hardy, Lancashire), a daughter of Hrant Gulesserian, an Armenian textile merchant who had moved from Constantinople to Manchester in 1904. Dickinson was placed for adoption as an infant and never again met his biological mother although he corresponded with her in later life when she was living in Jersey. Dickinson's biological father is unknown. David was subsequently adopted by the Dickinsons, a local couple. Mr Dickinson died when David was 12, and as his mother worked hard to keep the family together, David was partly brought up by his adoptive paternal grandmother, Sarah. David now has 2 grandchildren, Myles and Finley, who appeared on Big Star's Little Star.

Early life
Dickinson began an apprenticeship at an aircraft factory when he was 14, but quickly left to work in the cloth trade in central Manchester. At 19, Dickinson served three years of a four-year prison sentence for mail-order fraud. The majority of his sentence was spent at Strangeways in Manchester.

Dickinson set up in Manchester with the assistance of an old customer as silent partner, and the business ran until 1991 when, in light of forthcoming recession, the shop was closed. Dickinson decided to concentrate on selling antiques at prestigious fairs, taking stands at Olympia and other major antiques fairs three or four times a year, dealing in 18th- and 19th-century furniture and works of art.

Personal life
Dickinson met his wife, Lorne Lesley, a cabaret performer, in a nightclub in the 1960s, and they married in 1968. As a wedding gift Lorne gave David an antique regency mourning ring, set with a rose cut diamond. Lorne is of African, Welsh and Scottish ancestry; she hails from Tiger Bay, Cardiff. The couple live in the village of Prestbury in Cheshire. They have two grown-up children, and also grandchildren. One of Dickinson's grandsons, Miles, is an entrepreneur, who featured on Series 20 of BBC's Dragons' Den, becoming the youngest contestant to successfully secure investment from a Dragon.  

Dickinson's nickname is "The Duke", a reference to his wardrobe. For forty years he has used the same tailor, Chris Nicolaou, who appeared as a guest for Dickinson's This Is Your Life programme, when he was surprised by Michael Aspel at an auction house in Folkestone in November 2002.

Until May 2008, Dickinson drove a bright blue Bentley Continental GT. He owns two vehicles, the first being an eco-friendly electric Smart EV and the second a Reliant Regal van; this van was one of the famous yellow Trotters Independent Traders vans from the sitcom Only Fools and Horses, which Dickinson bought in 2007 for over £44,000.

TV career

In 1998, a chance meeting with a TV producer at a barbecue led to Dickinson's TV appearance, a two-part documentary for the BBC made about him and his preparation for a show at Olympia. His dark complexion (often implied to be a fake tan, but he says that it is because of his Armenian ancestry) and numerous catchphrases quickly caught the viewers' attention.

Dickinson came to public attention as an antiques expert on This Morning and BBC Two's The Antiques Show. His career break as a television celebrity came from presenting Bargain Hunt on BBC One at lunchtimes which gained a keen following amongst daytime viewers including students.

A primetime evening version of Bargain Hunt was broadcast for a few years following the success of the daytime show. Dickinson left the daytime edition of Bargain Hunt in 2003 and was replaced by Tim Wonnacott on the daytime slot while Dickinson carried on presenting the primetime, celebrity and Christmas versions of the show. He went on to present a reality show, Dealing With Dickinson on BBC One in 2005 which was cancelled after only one series. Dickinson left the BBC once the primetime editions of Bargain Hunt were cancelled.

Dickinson moved to ITV in 2006 to present a new daytime antiques programme, Dickinson's Real Deal which is broadcast on daytime weekday afternoons. Old episodes are frequently repeated. The show visits locations around the UK and asks people to come in and either sell their antiques and collectables for valuation by an antiques dealer who may offer to buy the item for cash. Alternatively, the participants can take a gamble and go to auction if the dealer's offer is refused or no offer is made to buy the object. The participant risks taking a lower price than offered by the dealer if the object fails to exceed the dealer's offer or fails to meet its reserve. Dickinson's job is to act as a mediator to help the sellers obtain the best prices from the dealers or to help them with the decision about whether to refuse the offer and to take the item to auction.

From 17 May 2010, The David Dickinson Show, a celebrity variety show, was broadcast on ITV for 10 episodes. In 2017, he presented David Dickinson's Name Your Price for ITV.

Catchphrases
 "Real bobby-dazzler" (particularly excellent item). Dickinson's biography is entitled What a Bobby Dazzler.
 "Cheap as chips" (bargain)

Guest appearances
In 2002, Dickinson appeared as a guest on Shooting Stars joining Team B led by Ulrika Jonsson with Johnny Vegas.

In 2004, Dickinson was one of several celebrities to have their portraits painted in the BBC One television series Star Portraits with Rolf Harris, and, also in 2004, he appeared in the first series of Strictly Come Dancing.

In 2005, Dickinson appeared on the ITV reality show I'm a Celebrity...Get Me Out of Here!, where he first announced that he had used heroin in his younger years. He also presented information slots for viewers on how to bid on satellite shopping channel Bid TV. He appeared in one episode of the ITV drama Heartbeat, playing an antiques dealer.

Dickinson explored his family background in an episode of the third series of the BBC genealogical documentary series Who Do You Think You Are? broadcast in the UK on 4 October 2006. He was able to trace relatives in both the UK and Istanbul.

On one radio episode of Dead Ringers, The Doctor (voiced by Jon Culshaw) telephoned Dickinson to ask him how much he could get for a magnetic core extractor that was believed to have been owned by the Doctor when he was played by Jon Pertwee. Dickinson described the extractor as "a bit of a bobby dazzler".

In March 2014, Dickinson appeared in the eleventh series of Ant & Dec's Saturday Night Takeaway. The duo disguised themselves with prosthetics and fake accents to dupe Dickinson into believing there was a live argument and subsequent car crash on the set of his new 'fake' show Long Lost Treasures. During the aftermath of the wind up and following the big reveal from Ant & Dec, Dickinson said "you two have done me up like a kipper!"

He played the Emperor in the third episode of The Keith & Paddy Picture Show ("Return of the Jedi").

References

External links
Official David Dickinson website

Bargain Hunt BBC America (Archived)
Who Do You Think You Are? - David Dickinson BBC History, 17 February 2011

1941 births
Living people
English television presenters
English television personalities
English businesspeople
Antiques experts
English people of Armenian descent
People from Stockport
People from Bollington
BBC television presenters
I'm a Celebrity...Get Me Out of Here! (British TV series) participants
20th-century English criminals
English male criminals
English prisoners and detainees
Prisoners and detainees of England and Wales